Lawrence P. "Laurie" Reis (November 20, 1858 in Chicago, Illinois – January 24, 1921 in Chicago, Illinois) was a 19th-century pitcher in Major League Baseball.

Sources

1858 births
1921 deaths
Major League Baseball pitchers
Baseball players from Chicago
Chicago White Stockings players
19th-century baseball players
Dubuque Red Stockings players